Valerija Valjak (born 2 January 1988) is a Macedonian footballer who plays as a defender for the North Macedonia national team.

International career
Valjak made her debut for the North Macedonia national team on 27 March 2010, against Norway.

References

1988 births
Living people
Women's association football defenders
Macedonian women's footballers
North Macedonia women's international footballers